Behrensia conchiformis is a species of moth in the family Noctuidae (the owlet moths). It is found in North America.

The MONA or Hodges number for Behrensia conchiformis is 10178.

Subspecies
These two subspecies belong to the species Behrensia conchiformis:
 Behrensia conchiformis conchiformis
 Behrensia conchiformis suffusa Buckett, 1964

References

Further reading

 
 
 

Noctuidae
Articles created by Qbugbot
Moths described in 1875